Indonesia participated in the 2014 Asian Games in Incheon, South Korea from 19 September to 4 October 2014.

Competitors

Medal summary

Medal by sport

Medal by Date

Medalists

Last updated 4 October 2014

Archery

Athletics

Badminton

Beach volleyball

Bowling

Boxing

Canoeing

Sprint

Cycling

BMX

Mountain Bike

Road

Equestrian

Fencing

Football

Men's tournament

First round

Round of 16

Judo

Karate

Rowing

Sailing

Sepaktakraw

Soft Tennis

Swimming

Taekwondo

Tennis

Weightlifting

Wrestling

Wushu

References

Nations at the 2014 Asian Games
2014
Asian Games